Cape Hatteras Light is a lighthouse located on Hatteras Island in the Outer Banks in the town of Buxton, North Carolina and is part of the Cape Hatteras National Seashore. The lighthouse’s semi-unique pattern makes it easy to recognize and famous. It is often ranked high on lists of most beautiful, and famous lighthouses in the US. 

The Outer Banks are a group of barrier islands on the North Carolina coast that separate the Atlantic Ocean from the coastal sounds and inlets.  Atlantic currents in this area made for excellent travel for ships, except in the area of Diamond Shoals, just offshore at Cape Hatteras.  Nearby, the warm Gulf Stream ocean current collides with the colder Labrador Current, creating ideal conditions for powerful ocean storms and sea swells.  The large number of ships that ran aground because of these shifting sandbars gave this area the nickname "Graveyard of the Atlantic."  It also led the U.S. Congress to authorize the construction of the Cape Hatteras Light. Its 198-foot height makes it the tallest brick lighthouse structure in the United States and 2nd in the world. Since its base is almost at sea level, it is only the 15th highest light in the United States, the first 14 being built on higher ground.

Hatteras Island Visitor Center and Museum of the Sea
Adjacent to the Cape Hatteras Light is the Hatteras Island Visitor Center and Museum of the Sea, operated by the National Park Service, which is located in the historic Cape Hatteras Lighthouse Double Keepers' Quarters.  Exhibits include the history, maritime heritage and natural history of the Outer Banks and the lighthouse.  The visitor center offers information about the Cape Hatteras National Seashore, ranger programs and a bookstore.

History

Original lighthouse
On July 10, 1794, after Secretary of Treasury Alexander Hamilton requested that they make a lighthouse on this location after his ship almost crashed and sunk on its to way to The New World giving it the nickname “Hamilton’s light” Congress appropriated $44,000 "for erecting a lighthouse on the headland of Cape Hatteras and a lighted beacon on Shell Castle Island, in the harbor of Ocracoke in the State of North Carolina."  The Cape Hatteras Lighthouse was constructed in 1802.

The original tower was built of dark sandstone and retained its natural color.

In July 1851, Lt. David D. Porter, USN, reported as follows:

In 1860 the Lighthouse Board reported that Cape Hatteras Lighthouse required protection, due to the outbreak of the Civil War. In 1862 the Board reported "Cape Hatteras, lens and lantern destroyed, light reexhibited.

Second lighthouse
At the behest of mariners and officers of the U.S. Navy, Congress appropriated $80,000 to the United States Lighthouse Board to construct a new beacon at Cape Hatteras in 1868.

Completed in just under two years under the direction of brevet Brigadier General J. H. Simpson of the U.S. Army Corps of Engineers, the new Cape Hatteras lighthouse cost $167,000. The new tower, from which the first-order light was first exhibited on December 16, 1871, was the tallest brick lighthouse tower in the world. The old tower was demolished in February 1871, leaving ruins that lasted until finally eroded away in a storm in 1980.

In the spring of 1879 the tower was struck by lightning. Cracks subsequently appeared in the masonry walls, which were remedied by placing a metal rod to connect the iron work of the tower with an iron disk sunk in the ground. In 1912 the candlepower of the light was increased from 27,000 to 80,000.

Ever since the completion of the new tower in 1870, there had begun a very gradual encroachment of the sea upon the beach. This did not become serious, however, until 1919, when the high water line had advanced to about 120 ft (36.5) from the base of the tower. Since that time the surf gnawed steadily toward the base of the tower until 1935, when the site was finally reached by the surf. Several attempts were made to arrest this erosion, but dikes and breakwaters had been of no avail. The abandoned brick tower was then put in the custody of the National Park Service.

The Civilian Conservation Corps and Works Progress Administration erected a series of wooden revetments which checked the wash that was carrying away the beach. In 1942, when German U-boats began attacking ships just offshore, the Coast Guard resumed its control over the brick tower and manned it as a lookout station until 1945.

The new light consisted of a  aviation-type rotating beacon of 250,000 candlepower, visible , and flashing white every 7.5 seconds. The steel skeleton tower, known as the Buxton Woods Tower, was retained by the Coast Guard in the event that the brick tower again became endangered by erosion requiring that the light again be moved.

The light displays a highly visible black and white diagonal daymark paint scheme.  It shares similar markings with the St. Augustine Light.  Another lighthouse, with helical markings—red and white 'candy cane stripe'-- is the White Shoal Light (Michigan), which is the only true 'barber pole' lighthouse in the United States.  Its distinctive "barber pole" paint job is consistent with other North Carolina black-and-white lighthouses, "each with their own pattern to help sailors identify lighthouses during daylight hours." The light pattern at night is a bright white flash every 7.5 seconds 
The National Park Service acquired ownership of the lighthouse when it was abandoned in 1935. Today the Coast Guard owns and operates the navigational equipment, while the National Park Service maintains the tower as a historic structure. The Hatteras Island Visitor Center, formerly the Double Keepers Quarters located next to the lighthouse, elaborates on the Cape Hatteras story and the lifestyle on the Outer Banks. Cape Hatteras Lighthouse, tallest in the United States, stands  from the bottom of the foundation to the peak of the roof. The construction order of 1,250,000 bricks was used in the construction of the lighthouse and principal keeper's quarters. The light is still active. Up until 1970 the light was still using its First Order Fresnel Lense. In 1970 it was replaced by a Aerobeacon. The light is used and maintained by the U.S Coast Guard as a Aid to Navigation, protecting Mariners from the icy depths of the Graveyard of the Atlantic. The active light can be seen from anywhere on Hatteras Island.

Relocation

In 1999, with the sea again encroaching, the Cape Hatteras lighthouse had to be moved from its original location at the edge of the ocean to safer ground. Due to erosion of the shore, the lighthouse was just  from the water's edge and was in imminent danger. All other support buildings at the site were also moved at the same time. All support buildings were placed back in positions that maintained their original compass orientations and distance/height relationship to the lighthouse. International Chimney Corp. of Buffalo, New York was awarded the contract to move the lighthouse, assisted by, among other contractors, Expert House Movers. The move was controversial at the time with speculation that the structure would not survive the move, resulting in lawsuits that were later dismissed. Despite some opposition, work progressed and the move was completed on September 14, 1999.

The Cape Hatteras Light House Station Relocation Project became known as "The Move of the Millennium." General contractor International Chimney and Expert House Movers won the 40th Annual Outstanding Civil Engineering Achievement Award from the American Society of Civil Engineers in 1999.  The Cape Hatteras Lighthouse is one of the tallest masonry structures ever moved (200 feet tall and weighing 5,000 tons).

Specifications
 Construction material: Approximately 1,250,000 bricks
 Height above sea level: 
 Height of the structure: 198.5 feet 
 Daymark: black double helix spiral stripes on white background 
 Number of steps: 257 steps to reach the light
 Brightness: 800,000 candle power  from each of two 1000-watt lamps
 Flash pattern: 1 second flash, 6.5 second ellipse
 Visibility: From 20 nautical miles (37 km) in clear conditions. In exceptional conditions, it has been seen from 51 miles (94 km) out.

See also
 List of tallest lighthouses in the world

References

Further reading

External links

 Moving the Cape Hatteras Lighthouse - Cape Hatteras National Seashore (U.S. National Park Service)
 Video showing the Cape Hatteras Lighthouse from the ground and the view from the top from 2016
 

Lighthouses completed in 1802
Lighthouses completed in 1870
Historic American Buildings Survey in North Carolina
Lighthouses on the National Register of Historic Places in North Carolina
National Historic Landmarks in North Carolina
Relocated buildings and structures in North Carolina
Hatteras Island
Museums in Dare County, North Carolina
Lighthouse museums in North Carolina
Historic Civil Engineering Landmarks
Civilian Conservation Corps in North Carolina
National Historic Landmark lighthouses
Works Progress Administration in North Carolina
Cape Hatteras National Seashore
National Register of Historic Places in Dare County, North Carolina
Historic districts on the National Register of Historic Places in North Carolina
1802 establishments in North Carolina